Gaius Pontius (fl. 321 BC), sometimes called Gavius Pontius, was a Samnite commander (clan Varry/Varriani) during the Second Samnite War. He is most well known for his victory over the Roman legions at the Battle of the Caudine Forks in 321 BC.  He was eventually captured and executed by Fabius Rullianus.

Early command
Gaius Pontius was a Meddix, a Samnite position similar to a Roman Consul or Magistratus at the beginning of the Second Samnite War. He controlled a force of nearly 9,000, including nearly 1,000 cavalrymen. With this force, he won a series of early victories, which included taking the towns of Canusium and Gnaitha, and defeating the army under the command of Cornelius Lentulus. The Samnites failed to take advantage of these victories, however, and the Romans continued to press into Samnite territory.

Battle of the Caudine Forks 

In 321 BC, the Romans were moving into Samnium, and Pontius, who was encamped at Caudium, discovered that the army led by the Roman Consuls was near the town of Calatia. He devised a plan to trap the Roman army, and quickly sent ten shepherds to the Roman encampment. They told the Romans that the Samnite army was laying siege to the town of Luceria, in the region of Apulia. 

The Romans fell for his trap, and found themselves cornered by the Samnite army in a narrow pass. They were forced to surrender to Pontius.

Aftermath 
As recorded by Livy, Pontius was confused as to what should become of the Roman army which had surrendered to him. He sent a letter to his father, the Samnite statesman Herennius Pontius, and the reply was that he should free them all, and therefore make Rome an ally. Pontius did not like this idea, and sent another letter to his father, saying so. Herennius, in a seemingly hypocritical manner, told his son to execute the entire army, saying that it would destroy the threat of Rome for a long time. Pontius knew that the number of Romans were simply too large to have them all executed, so he sent for his father in person, and asked him if there was a middle road. Herennius advised his son not to take that road, as it would not only humiliate the Romans, but leave them with the means to carry out revenge. 

Pontius ended up ignoring his father's advice and forcing the Romans to walk under a yoke composed of Roman spears. This was supreme humiliation, as it was seen as cowardly for a Roman soldier to lose his spear, and the army went back to Rome smarting but intact. 

Rome's revenge was swift, and ended up with the Samnites being soundly defeated, and Pontius being executed years after the battle.

Sources 
 Appian's History of Rome: The Samnite Wars (1)
 The Caudine Forks
 Livy's History of Rome: Book 9
 From Barbarians to New Men: Greek, Roman, and modern perceptions of peoples from the central Apennines by Emma Dench
 The History of Rome by Theodor Mommsen
 Livy: Periochae 11-15

References

Generals
Samnite people
Year of death unknown
Year of birth unknown
4th-century BC people
Pontii
People executed by the Roman Republic